The Archdiocese of Lyon (Latin: Archidiœcesis Lugdunensis; French: Archidiocèse de Lyon), formerly the Archdiocese of Lyon–Vienne–Embrun, is a Latin Church metropolitan archdiocese of the Catholic Church in France. The archbishops of Lyon serve as successors to Saints Pothinus and Irenaeus, the first and second bishops of Lyon, respectively, and are also called primates of Gaul. He is usually elevated to the rank of cardinal. Bishop Olivier de Germay was appointed archbishop on 22 October 2020.

History

Persecution
The "Deacon of Vienne", who was martyred at Lyon during the persecution of 177, was probably a deacon installed at Vienne by the ecclesiastical authority of Lyon. The confluence of the Rhône and the Saône, where sixty Gallic tribes had erected the famous altar to Rome and Augustus, was also the centre from which Christianity was gradually propagated throughout Gaul. The presence at Lyon of numerous Asiatic Christians and their almost daily communications with the Orient were likely to arouse the susceptibilities of the Gallo-Romans. A persecution arose under Marcus Aurelius. Its victims at Lyon numbered forty-eight, half of them of Greek origin, half Gallo-Roman, among others Saint Blandina, and Saint Pothinus, first Bishop of Lyon, sent to Gaul by Saint Polycarp about the middle of the 2nd century. The legend according to which he was sent by Saint Clement dates from the 12th century and is without foundation. The letter addressed to the Christians of Asia and Phrygia in the name of the faithful of Vienne and Lyon, and relating the persecution of 177, is considered by Ernest Renan as one of the most extraordinary documents possessed by any literature; it is the baptismal certificate of Christianity in France. The successor of Saint Pothinus was the illustrious Saint Irenaeus (177-202).

The discovery on the Hill of Saint Sebastian of ruins of a naumachia capable of being transformed into an amphitheatre, and of some fragments of inscriptions apparently belonging to an altar of Augustus, has led several archæologists to believe that the martyrs of Lyon suffered death on this hill. Very ancient tradition, however, represents the church of Ainay as erected at the place of their martyrdom. The crypt of Saint Pothinus, under the choir of the church of St. Nizier, was destroyed in 1884. But there are still revered at Lyon the prison cell of Saint Pothinus, where Anne of Austria, Louis XIV, and Pius VII came to pray, and the crypt of Saint Irenaeus built at the end of the 5th century by Saint Patiens, which contains the body of Saint Irenaeus. There are numerous funerary inscriptions of primitive Christianity in Lyon; the earliest dates from the year 334. In the 2nd and 3rd centuries, the See of Lyon enjoyed great renown throughout Gaul: witness the local legends of Besançon and of several other cities relative to the missionaries sent out by Saint Irenaeus. Faustinus, bishop in the second half of the 3rd century, wrote to Saint Cyprian and Pope Stephen I, in 254, regarding the Novatian tendencies of Marcian, Bishop of Arles. But when Diocletian's new provincial organization (tetrarchy) had taken away from Lyon its position as metropolis of the three Gauls, the prestige of Lyon diminished for a time.

Merovingian period

At the end of the empire and during the Merovingian period several saints, as follows, are counted among the Bishops of Lyon. Saint Justus (374-381) who died in a monastery in the Thebaid (Egypt) and was renowned for the orthodoxy of his doctrine in the struggle against Arianism (the church of the Maccabees, whither his body was brought, was as early as the 5th century a place of pilgrimage under the name of the collegiate church of Saint Justus). Saint Alpinus and Saint Martin (disciple of Saint Martin of Tours; end of 4th century); Saint Antiochus (400-410); Saint Elpidius (410-422); Saint Sicarius (422-33); Saint Eucherius (c. 433-50), a monk of Lérins and the author of homilies, from whom doubtless dates the foundation at Lyon of the "hermitages" of which more will be said below; Saint Patiens (456-98) who successfully combated the famine and Arianism, and whom Sidonius Apollinaris praised in a poem; Saint Lupicinus (491-94); Saint Rusticus (494-501); Saint Stephanus (d. before 515), who with Saint Avitus of Vienne convoked a council at Lyon for the conversion of the Arians; Saint Viventiolus (515-523), who in 517 presided with Saint Avitus at the Council of Epaone; Saint Lupus, a monk, afterwards bishop (535-42), probably the first archbishop, who when signing in 438 the Council of Orléans added the title of "metropolitanus"; Saint Sardot or Sacerdos (549-542), who presided in 549 at the Council of Orléans, and who obtained from King Childebert the foundation of the general hospital; Saint Nicetius or Nizier (552-73), who received from the pope the title of patriarch, and whose tomb was honoured by miracles. The prestige of Saint Nicetius was lasting; his successor Saint Priseus (573-588) bore the title of patriarch, and brought the council of 585 to decide that national synods should be convened every three years at the instance of the patriarch and of the king; Saint Ætherius (588-603), who was a correspondent of Saint Gregory the Great and who perhaps consecrated Saint Augustine, the Apostle of England; Saint Aredius (603-615); Saint Annemundus or Chamond (c. 650), friend of Saint Wilfrid, godfather of Clotaire III, put to death by Ebroin together with his brother, and patron of the town of Saint-Chamond, Loire; Saint Genesius or Genes (660-679 or 680), Benedictine abbot of Fontenelle, grand almoner and minister of Queen Bathilde; Saint Lambertus (c. 680-690), also abbot of Fontenelle.

At the end of the 5th century Lyon was the capital of the Kingdom of Burgundy, but after 534 it passed under the domination of the kings of France. Ravaged by the Saracens in 725, the city was restored through the liberality of Charlemagne who established a rich library in the monastery of Ile Barbe. In the time of Saint Patiens and the priest Constans (d. 488) the school of Lyon was famous; Sidonius Apollinaris was educated there. The letter of Leidrade to Charlemagne (807) shows the care taken by the emperor for the restoration of learning in Lyon. With the aid of the deacon Florus he made the school so prosperous that in the 10th century Englishmen went there to study.

Carolingian period
Under Charlemagne and his immediate successors, the Bishops of Lyon, whose ascendancy was attested by the number of councils over which they were called to preside, played an important theological part. Adoptionism had no more active enemies than Leidrade (798-814) and Agobard (814-840). When Felix of Urgel continued rebellious to the condemnations pronounced against adoptionism from 791-799 by the Councils of Ciutad, Friuli, Ratisbon, Frankfort, and Rome, Charlemagne conceived the idea of sending to Urgel with Nebridius, Bishop of Narbonne, Benedict of Aniane, and Archbishop Leidrade, a native of Nuremberg and Charlemagne's librarian. They preached against Adoptionism in Spain, conducted Felix in 799 to the Council of Aachen where he seemed to submit to the arguments of Alcuin, and then brought him back to his diocese. But the submission of Felix was not complete; Agobard, "Chorepiscopus" of Lyon, convicted him anew of adoptionism in a secret conference, and when Felix died in 815 there was found among his papers a treatise in which he professed adoptionism. Then Agobard, who had become Archbishop of Lyon in 814 after Leidrade's retirement to the Abbey of St. Medard, Soissons, composed a long treatise against that heresy.

Agobard
Agobard displayed great activity as a pastor and a publicist in his opposition to the Jews and to various superstitions. His rooted hatred for all superstition led him in his treatise on images into certain expressions which savoured of Iconoclasm. The five historical treatises which he wrote in 833 to justify the deposition of Louis the Pious, who had been his benefactor, are a stain on his life. Louis the Pious, having been restored to power, caused Agobard to be deposed in 835 by the Council of Thionville, but three years later gave him back his see, in which he died in 840. During the exile of Agobard the See of Lyon had been for a short time administered by Amalarius of Metz, whom the deacon Florus charged with heretical opinions regarding the "triforme corpus Christi", and who took part in the controversies with Gottschalk on the subject of predestination.

Amolon (841-852) and Saint Remy (852-75) continued the struggle against the heresy of Valence, which condemned this heresy, and also was engaged in strife with Hincmar. From 879-1032 Lyon formed part of the Kingdom of Provence and afterwards of the second Kingdom of Burgundy. In 1032 Rudolph III of Burgundy died and his kingdom eventually went to Conrad II. The portion of Lyon situated on the left bank of the Saône became, at least nominally, an imperial city. Finally Archbishop Burchard II, brother of Rudolph, claimed rights of sovereignty over Lyon as inherited from his mother, Matilda, daughter of Louis IV of France; in this way the government of Lyon, instead of being exercised by the distant emperor, became a matter of dispute between the counts who claimed the inheritance and the successive archbishops.

Lyon attracted the attention of Cardinal Hildebrand, who held a council there in 1055 against the simoniacal bishops. In 1076, as Gregory VII, he deposed Archbishop Humbert (1063–76) for simony.

Saint Gebuin (Jubinus), who succeeded Humbert, was the confidant of Gregory VII and contributed to the reform of the Church by the two councils of 1080 and 1082, at which were excommunicated Manasses of Reims, Fulk of Anjou, and the monks of Marmoutiers.

It was under the episcopate of Saint Gebuin that Gregory VII (20 April 1079) established the primacy of the Church of Lyon over the Provinces of Rouen, Tours, and Sens, which primacy was specially confirmed by Callistus II, despite the letter written to him in 1126 by Louis VI in favour of the church of Sens. As far as it regarded the Province of Rouen this letter was later suppressed by a decree of the king's council in 1702, at the request of Jacques-Nicolas Colbert, Archbishop of Rouen.

Hugh of Die (1081–1106), the successor of Saint Gebuin, friend of Saint Anselm, and for a while legate of Gregory VII in France and Burgundy, had differences later on with Victor III, who excommunicated him for a time. The latter pope came to Lyon in 1106, consecrated the church of Ainay Abbey, and dedicated one of its altars in honour of the Immaculate Conception. The Feast of the Immaculate Conception was solemnized at Lyon about 1128, perhaps at the instance of Saint Anselm of Canterbury, and Saint Bernard wrote to the canons of Lyon to complain that they should not have instituted a feast without consulting the pope.

Sovereignty
As soon as Thomas Becket, Archbishop of Canterbury, had been proclaimed Blessed (1173), his cult was instituted at Lyon. Lyon of the 12th century thus has a glorious place in the history of Catholic liturgy and even of dogma, but the 12th century was also marked by the heresy of Peter Waldo and the Waldenses, the Poor Men of Lyon, who were opposed by John of Canterbury (1181–1193), and by an important change in the political situation of the archbishops.

In 1157 Emperor Frederick Barbarossa confirmed the sovereignty of the Archbishops of Lyon; thenceforth there was a lively contest between them and the counts. An arbitration effected by the pope in 1167 had no result, but by the treaty of 1173, Guy, Count of Forez, ceded to the canons of the primatial church of St. John his title of count of Lyon and his temporal authority.

Then came the growth of the Commune, more belated in Lyon than in many other cities, but in 1193 the archbishop had to make some concession to the citizens. The 13th century was a period of conflict. Three times, in 1207, 1269, and 1290, grave troubles broke out between the partisans of the archbishop who dwelt in the château of Pierre Seize, those of the count-canons who lived in a separate quarter near the cathedral, and partisans of the townsfolk. Gregory X attempted without success to restore peace by two Acts, 2 April 1273 and 11 November 1274. The kings of France were always inclined to side with the commune; after the siege of Lyon by Louis X (1310), the treaty of 10 April 1312 definitively attached Lyon to the Kingdom of France, but until the beginning of the 15th century the Church of Lyon was allowed to coin its own money.

If the 13th century had imperiled the political sovereignty of the archbishops, it had on the other hand made Lyon a kind of second Rome. Gregory X was a former canon of Lyon, while the future Innocent V was Archbishop of Lyon from 1272 to 1273. Innocent IV and Gregory X sought refuge at Lyon from the Hohenstaufen, and held there two general councils of Lyon. Local tradition relates that it was on seeing the red hat of the canons of Lyon that the courtiers of Innocent IV conceived the idea of obtaining from the Council of Lyon its decree that the cardinals should henceforth wear red hats. The sojourn of Innocent IV at Lyon was marked by numerous works of public utility, to which the pope gave vigorous encouragement. He granted indulgences to the faithful who should assist in the construction of the bridge over the Rhône, replacing that destroyed about 1190 by the passage of the troops of Richard Cœur de Lion on their way to the Crusade. The building of the churches of St. John and St. Justus was pushed forward with activity; he sent delegates even to England to solicit alms for this purpose and he consecrated the high altar in both churches.

At Lyon were crowned Clement V (1305) and Pope John XXII (1310); at Lyon in 1449 the antipope Felix V renounced the tiara; there, too, was held in 1512, without any definite conclusion, the last session of the schismatical Council of Pisa against Julius II. In 1560 the Calvinists took Lyon by surprise, but they were driven out by Antoine d'Albon, Abbot of Savigny and later Archbishop of Lyon. Again masters of Lyon in 1562, they were driven thence by the Maréchal de Vieuville. At the command of the famous Baron des Adrets they committed numerous acts of violence in the region of Montbrison. It was at Lyon that Henry IV of France, the converted Calvinist king, married Marie de' Medici (9 December 1600).

Later Middle Ages
Gerson, whose old age was spent at Lyon in the abbey of St. Paul, where he instructed poor children, died there in 1429. Saint Francis de Sales died at Lyon on 28 December 1622. The Curé Colombet de St. Amour was celebrated at St. Etienne in the 17th century for the generosity with which he founded the Hôtel-Dieu (the charity hospital) and  free schools, and also fed the workmen during the famine of 1693.

M. Guigue has catalogued the eleven "hermitages" (eight of them for men and three for women) which were distinctive of the ascetical life of Christian Lyon in the Middle Ages; these were cells in which persons shut themselves up for life after four years of trial. The system of hermitages along the lines described by Grimalaius and Olbredus in the 9th century flourished especially from the 11th to the 13th century, and disappeared completely in the 16th. These hermitages were the private property of a neighbouring church or monastery, which installed therein for life a male or female recluse. The general almshouse of Lyon, or charity hospital, was founded in 1532 after the great famine of 1531, under the supervision of eight administrators chosen from among the more important citizens.

The institution of the jubilee of Saint Nizier dates beyond a doubt to the stay of Innocent IV at Lyon. This jubilee, which had all the privileges of the secular jubilees of Rome, was celebrated each time that Low Thursday, the feast of Saint Nizier, coincided with 2 April, i.e. whenever the feast of Easter itself was on the earliest day allowed by the paschal cycle, namely 22 March. In 1818, when this coincidence occurred, the feast of Saint Nizier was not celebrated. But the cathedral of St. John also enjoys a great jubilee each time that the feast of Saint John the Baptist coincides with Corpus Christi, that is, whenever the feast of Corpus Christi falls on 24 June. It is certain that in 1451 the coincidence of these two feasts was celebrated with special splendour by the population of Lyon, then emerging from the troubles of the Hundred Years' War, but there is no document to prove that the jubilee indulgence existed at that date. However, Lyonnese tradition places the first great jubilee in 1451; subsequent jubilees took place in 1546, 1666, 1734 and 1886.

"Among the Churches of France", wrote Saint Bernard to the canons of Lyon, "that of Lyon has hitherto had ascendancy over all the others, as much for the dignity of its see as for its praiseworthy institutions. It is especially in the Divine Office that this judicious Church has never readily acquiesced in unexpected and sudden novelties, and has never submitted to be tarnished by innovations which are becoming only to youth."

Montazet controversy
In the 18th century Archbishop Antoine de Montazet, contrary to the Bull of Pius V on the breviary, changed the text of the breviary and the missal, from which there resulted a century of conflict for the Church of Lyon. The efforts of Pope Pius IX and Cardinal Bonald to suppress the innovations of Montazet provoked resistance on the part of the canons, who feared an attempt against the traditional Lyonnese ceremonies. This culminated in 1861 in a protest on the part of the clergy and the laity, as much with regard to the civil power as to the Vatican. Finally, on 4 February 1864, at a reception of the parish priests of Lyon, Pius IX declared his displeasure at this agitation and assured them that nothing should be changed in the ancient Lyonnese ceremonies; by a Brief of 17 March 1864, he ordered the progressive introduction of the Roman breviary and missal in the diocese. The primatial church of Lyon adopted them for public services on 8 December 1869. One of the rites of the ancient Gallican liturgy, retained by the Church of Lyon, is the blessing of the people by the bishop at the moment of Communion.

1800s
The Concordat of 1801 assigned as the boundaries of the Archdiocese of Lyon the Departments of the Rhône and Loire and the Ain and as suffragans the Dioceses of Mende, Grenoble, and Chambéry. The Archdiocese of Lyon was authorized by Letters Apostolic of 29 November 1801, to unite with his title the titles of the suppressed metropolitan Sees of Vienne and Embrun. Thus the dioceses of Belley and Mâcon, were suppressed on November 29, 1801 with all of Belley's and some of Mâcon's territory added to the Archdiocese.  The Diocese of Belley was restored on October 6, 1822, while the Archdiocese's name changed to Lyon-Vienne, with the title of Embrun passing to the Archbishop of Aix (from whence, 2008, to the Bishop of Gap).

1900s
A new diocese of Saint-Étienne was erected on December 26, 1970, from the Archdiocese's territory.  The Archdiocese's name returned to Lyon on December 15, 2006 (with the title of Vienne passing to its suffragan Grenoble).

Saints
The Diocese of Lyon honours as saints: Saint Epipodius and his companion Saint Alexander, probably martyrs under Marcus Aurelius; the priest Saint Peregrinus (3rd century); Saint Baldonor (Galmier), a native of Aveizieux, at first a locksmith, whose piety was remarked by the bishop, Saint Viventiolus: he became a cleric at the Abbey of St. Justus, then subdeacon, and died about 760; the thermal resort of "Aquæ Segestæ", in whose church Viventiolus met him, has taken the name of Saint Galmier; Saint Viator (d. about 390), who followed the Bishop Saint Justus to the Thebaid; Saints Romanus and Lupicinus (5th century), natives of the Diocese of Lyon, who lived as solitaries within the present territory of the Diocese of Saint-Claude; Saint Consortia, d. about 578, who, according to a legend criticized by Tillemont, was a daughter of Saint Eucherius; Saint Rambert, soldier and martyr in the 7th century, patron of the town of the same name; Blessed Jean Pierre Néel, b. in 1832 at Ste. Catherine sur Riviere, martyred at Kay-Tcheou in 1862.

Suffragan

Dioceses
Annecy
Belley-Ars
Archdiocese of Chambéry
Grenoble-Vienne
Saint-Étienne
Valence (-Die-Saint-Paul-Trois-Châteaux)
Viviers

Province
Suffragan as Primate of the Gauls:
Rouen
Tours
Sens (former province)

Prelates

Bishops of Lyon
incomplete
Saint Pothinus ( –177)
Saint Irenaeus

Archbishops of Lyon
incomplete

Zechariah of Lyon (195 – after 202)
 Helios of Lyon
 Faustinus (second half of the 3rd century)
 Lucius Verus
 Julius
 Ptolémaeus
 Vocius fl.314
 Maximus (Maxime)
 Tétradius (Tetrade)
 Verissimus fl. 343
St. Justus (374–381)
 St. Alpinus fl.254
St. Martin (disciple of St. Martin of Tours; end of 4th century)
 St. Antiochus (400–410)
St. Elpidius (410–422)
St. Sicarius (422–433)
St. Eucherius (c. 433–450)
St. Patiens (456–498) who successfully combated the famine and Arianism, and whom Sidonius Apollinaris praised in a poem
St. Lupicinus (491–494)
St. Rusticus (494–501)
St. Stephanus (501 – Before 515), who with St. Avitus of Vienne, convoked a council at Lyon for the conversion of the Arians
St. Viventiolus (515–523), who in 517 presided with St. Avitus at the Council of Epaone
St. Lupus (535–542), a monk, probably the first archbishop, who when signing in 538 the Council of Orléans added the title of "metropolitanus"
Licontius (Léonce)
St. Sardot or Sacerdos (549–552)
St. Nicetius or Nizier (552–73), Patriarch
St. Priscus of Lyon (573–588), Patriarch
St. Ætherius (588–603), who was a correspondent of St. Gregory the Great and who perhaps consecrated St. Augustine, the Apostle of England
St. Aredius (603–615)
St. Viventius
St. Annemund or Chamond (c. 650), friend of St. Wilfrid, godfather of Clotaire III, put to death by Ebroin together with his brother, and patron of the town of Saint-Chamond, Loire
St. Genesius or Genes (660–679 or 680), Benedictine Abbot of Fontenelle, grand almoner and minister of Queen Bathilde
St. Lambertus (c. 680–690), also Abbot of Fontenelle
Leidrad (798–814)
Agobard, Chorbishop ( –814)
Agobard (814–834, 837–840)
Amalarius of Metz (834–837) administrator
 Amulo, (840-852)
Remigius (852–875)
St. Aurelian (d. 895)
Burchard II of Lyon (?–?)
Burchard III of Lyon (?–1036)
Halinard (1046–1052)

Primates of Gauls and Archbishop of Lyon

 1077–1082 Saint Gebuin
 1081–1106 Hugh of Die
 1128–1129 Renaud of Semur
 1131–1139 Peter I
 fl. 1180 Guichard of Pontigny 
 1193–1226 Renaud de Forez
 1227–1234 Robert of Auvergne
 1289 Bérard de Got 
 1290–1295 Louis of Naples 
 1301–1308 Louis de Villars
 1308–1332 Peter of Savoy
 1340–1342 Guy III d'Auvergne, Cardinal de Boulogne, papal diplomat
 1342–1354 Henri II de Villars
 1356–1358 Raymond Saquet
 1358–1365 Guillaume II de Thurey
 1365–1375 Charles d'Alençon
 1375–1389 Jean II de Talaru
 1389–1415 Philippe III de Thurey
 1415–1444 Amédée II de Talaru
 1444–1446 Geoffroy II de Versailles
 1447–1488 Charles II of Bourbon
 1488–1499 Hugues II de Talaru
 1499–1500 André d'Espinay (cardinal)
 1501–1536 François II de Rohan
 1537–1539 John, Cardinal of Lorraine
 1539–1551 Ippolito II d'Este, whom king Francis I of France named Cardinal protector of the crown of France at the court of Pope Paul III, and a patron of scholars
 1551–1562 Cardinal François de Tournon, who negotiated several times between Francis I and Emperor Charles V, combated the Reformation and founded the Collège de Tournon, which the Jesuits later made one of the most celebrated educational establishments of the kingdom
 1562–1564 Ippolito II d'Este, whom king Francis I of France named Cardinal protector of the crown of France at the court of Pope Paul III, and a patron of scholars
 1564–1573 Antoine d'Albon, editor of Rufinus and Ausonius
 1573–1599 Pierre d'Epinac, active auxiliary of the League
 1612–1626 Denis-Simon de Marquemont
 1628–1653 Alphonse-Louis du Plessis de Richelieu (Sep 1628 – 23 Mar 1653)
 1653–1693 Camille de Neufville de Villeroy  
 1714–1731 François-Paul de Neufville de Villeroy  (15 Aug 1714 – 6 Feb 1731)
 1732–1739 Charles-François de Châteauneuf de Rochebonne 
 1740–1758 Pierre Guérin de Tencin  (11 Nov 1740 – 2 Mar 1758)
 1758–1788 Antoine de Malvin de Montazet (16 Mar 1758 – 2 May 1788), of Jansenist tendencies, and who had published for his seminary by the Oratorian Joseph Valla six volumes of "Institutiones theologicæ" known as "Théologie de Lyon", and spread throughout Italy by Scipio Ricci until condemned by the Index in 1792
 1788–1799 Yves-Alexandre de Marbeuf (12 May 1788 – 15 Apr 1799)
 1791–1794 Antoine-Adrien Lamourette (1742–1794), constitutional bishop of Lyon from 27 March 1791 to 11 January 1794, the date of his death on the scaffold.

Primates of Gauls and Archbishop of Lyon-Vienne
(Cardinal) Joseph Fesch (29 July 1802 – 13 May 1839) Archbishop of Lyon-Vienne-Embrun (until 1822)
(Cardinal) Joachim-Jean d'Isoard (13 June 1839 – 7 October 1839)
(Cardinal) Louis-Jacques-Maurice de Bonald (4 December 1839 – 25 February 1870)
Jacques-Marie Ginoulhiac (2 March 1870 – 17 November 1875), known for his "Histoire du dogme catholique pendant let trois premiers siècles".
 (Cardinal) Louis-Marie Caverot (20 April 1876 – 23 January 1887)
(Cardinal) Joseph-Alfred Foulon (23 March 1887 – 23 January 1893)
(Cardinal) Pierre-Hector Coullie (14 June 1893 – 11 September 1912)
(Cardinal) Hector Sévin (2 December 1912 – 4 May 1916)
(Cardinal) Louis-Joseph Maurin (1 December 1916 – 16 November 1936)
(Cardinal) Pierre-Marie Gerlier (30 July 1937 – 17 January 1965)
(Cardinal) Jean-Marie Villot (17 January 1965  – 7 April 1967)
(Cardinal) Alexandre Renard (28 May 1967 – 29 October 1981)
(Cardinal) Albert Decourtray (29 October 1981 – 16 September 1994)
(Cardinal) Jean Marie Balland (27 May 1995 – 1 March 1998)
(Cardinal) Louis-Marie Billé (10 July 1998 – 12 March 2002)
(Cardinal) Philippe Barbarin (16 July 2002 – 6 March 2020)
Olivier de Germay (20 December 2020 – present)

See also
 Catholic Church in France
 History of Lyon

References

Bibliography

Reference works
 (Use with caution; obsolete)
  (in Latin) 
 (in Latin)

Studies

External links
 Centre national des Archives de l'Église de France, L'Épiscopat francais depuis 1919, retrieved: 2016-12-24. 
  

Lyon
Dioceses established in the 2nd century
 
Christianity in Lyon
Roman Lyon
Medieval Lyon
19th century in Lyon
18th century in Lyon